View of the Village is an oil-on-canvas painting created in 1868 by the French Impressionist Jean-Frédéric Bazille, now in the Musée Fabre in Montpellier.

It shows a young woman sitting on a stone ledge overlooking  the village of Castelnau-le-Lez in the Hérault department of France. 

As in his compositionally similar The Pink Dress of 1864 he used the Barbizon school's technique of framing the scene, using dark vegetation to concentrate the viewer's eye on the sunlit village in the distance. In this later work additional interest is provided by the subject looking towards the viewer.

The work was exhibited at the Salon the following year.

References

1868 paintings
Paintings in the collection of the Musée Fabre
Landscape art
Paintings by Frédéric Bazille